This article deals with socialism in South Korea or South Korean Left. Socialists in South Korea are under institutional and social oppression due to the National Security Act. Socialist and anti-capitalist forces have difficulty forming political parties, but there are organizations that operate as organizations, not political parties. In a broad sense, "South Korean Left" includes (non-socialist) left-wing nationalism and liberal-progressivism, but in a narrow sense, "South Korean Left" means only socialism and green politics.

South Korean socialists tend to call themselves "progressives", but they do not recognize progressive-liberals as "progressives". However, "progressivism in South Korea" and "socialism in South Korea" are distinct concepts.

Historically, socialist political parties have often secured seats in the National Assembly in South Korea, but no socialist political party is currently represented in the National Assembly.

History 

Since 1945, socialism in South Korea has historically been divided into 'Communist' and 'anti-Communist'. Most 'anti-Communist' socialists used to be called Hyukshinkye. 

During this time, many communists in the South moved to North Korea, but some remained in the South. A representative example is Workers' Party of South Korea. South Korea has legally banned 'Communist' political activities since its founding, but after Korean War, 'anti-Communist' socialist forces were also socially oppressed. Thus, until South Korea was democratized after 1987, left-wing activities in South Korea were generally only legally allowed to be non-marketing, moderate social democrats who supported capitalism, and most of the more left-wing and anti-capitalist left-wing political activities were banned.

The United States remained silent about the massacres in Gwangju by new-military coup forces in the 1980s, and backed the Chun Doo-hwan government. This served as an opportunity for some of the democratization movement forces in South Korea to develop anti-American sentiment. As a result, some of South Korea's moderate liberal pro-democratization activists gradually accepted socialism and became more left-wing. Revolutionary socialism has been quite popular in the South Korean left-wing Undongkwon camp since the 80s, but since the 90s, South Korean Undongkwon people's have gradually moved away from socialism. The harsh crackdown on socialists in South Korea was justified by the National Security Act.

Having held seats in the National Assembly in the 2000s and early 2010s, the Democratic Labor Party (DLP) and the New Progressive Party (NPP) were left-wing parties that officially supported "democratic socialism". However, the Democratic Labor Party abandoned socialism from June 2011, and later the Unified Progressive Party supported "left-wing nationalism" but not "socialism". Much of the New Progressive Party's political stake was officially inherited by the Labor Party, but informally by the Justice Party (JP). JP politicians from major NPPs, including Sim Sang-jung, gave up "socialism" and were moderate in support of "liberalism".

Since the mid-2010s, political parties that officially support "socialism" have never secured seats in the National Assembly. The left-wing Justice Party, which currently holds seats in National Assembly, does not support "socialism" in a narrow sense.

Squid Game (2021 drama) and Parasite (2019 film) which gained international popularity, is evaluated as containing criticism of capitalism.

Political stance 
In South Korea, "socialist" (non-nationalist) traditions, "Minjokhaebang" (anti-American left-wing nationalist) traditions, and "liberal" (pro-American left-liberal) traditions appear differently in diplomatic tendencies. Left-wing nationalists and liberals have something in common in that they are critical of Japan. While left-wing nationalists are critical of American imperialism. In contrast, liberals have supported America-friendly foreign policy. On the other hand, South Korean socialists criticize American imperialism, but do not support the 'anti-Japan' of left-wing nationalists and liberals, and insist on supporting and solidarity with liberals and socialists in Japan. Unlike liberal nationalist and left-wing nationalists, South Korean socialists oppose anti-Japan/anti-China nationalism and support "international solidarity" (국제연대).

In South Korea media, non-socialist/left-wing nationalist Progressive Party is perceived as "far-left", but non-nationalist/democratic socialist Labor Party is not. The reason is that the Progressive Party is more anti-American and sympathy for North Korea than the Labor Party. But the Progressive Party does not support socialism, is perceived by socialists as a liberal party, and is not recognized as a socialist party. South Korean socialists recognize the Labor Party as a "left-wing", but do not recognize the Justice Party and the Progressive Party as a "left-wing". South Korean socialists also argue that the Progressive Party is "centre-left", not "left-wing" and "far-left".

However, in the case of Juche faction or Stalinists, it may be different from the political stance of ordinary South Korean socialists.

Socialist groups in South Korea

Current 
 Bolshevik Groups (볼셰비키그룹) - Trotskyist organization
 Factions in the Green Party Korea - some eco-socialists in the party
 Labor Party
 People's Democracy Party - Communist and left-wing nationalist political party. Most South Korean socialists are hardly nationalists because they are critical of the Minjokhaebang movement, but the People's Democratic Party supports left-wing nationalism.
 Progressive Leftist (진보좌파) - leftist social-democrat faction of the Justice Party
 Workers Institute of Social Science (노동사회과학연구소) - Marxist-Leninism organization

Historical 
 Anti-Imperialist National Democratic Front
 Democratic Labor Party
 New Progressive Party
 People's Party of Korea
 Socialist Party
 Socialist Revolutionary Workers' Party
 South Korean Socialist Workers' Alliance
 United Socialist Party of Korea
 Workers' Party of South Korea

The leading socialists of South Korea

Socialists and leftist social-democrats 
 Baik Tae-ung
 Bong Joon-ho
 Hong Sehwa
 Jo So-ang (disputed)
 
 
 Lee Yong-gill
 Lyuh Woon-hyung
 Park Nohae
 Pak Noja
 Park Eun-ji

Communists 
 Kang Mun-sok
 Pak Hon-yong

Juche advocates  

They claim to be "pacifist" and "chinbuk", but opponents refer to them as "jongbuk".
 
 Lim Su-kyung (disputed)
 Roh Su-hui

Former socialists 
Some "social-democratic liberals" (non-socialist "progressives") are also included.

 Cho Kuk (socialists → liberals)
 Eun Soo-mi (socialists → liberals)
 Ha Tae-keung (Juche advocates → conservatives)
 Kim Moon-soo (socialists → conservatives)
 Kim Yong-hwan (Juche advocates → human rights activists on North Korea)
 Park Chung-hee (Marxist-Leninist → conservatives)
 Park Heong-joon (Marxist-Leninist → conservatives)
 Park Yong-jin (socialists → liberals)
 Rhyu Si-min (socialists → liberals)
 Roh Hoe-chan (socialists → progressives)
 Sim Sang-jung (socialists → progressives)

See also 
 Autumn Uprising of 1946
 Korean Confederation of Trade Unions (factions)
 South Korean Labor Movement
 Three Principles of the Equality

External links 
 Namuwiki — Socialism in Republic of Korea

Notes

References

 
Anti-imperialism in Korea
Anti-nationalism in Korea
Progressivism in South Korea
South Korea